Small nuclear ribonucleoprotein-associated protein N is a protein that in humans is encoded by the SNRPN gene.

The protein encoded by this gene is one polypeptide of a small nuclear ribonucleoprotein complex and belongs to the snRNP SMB/SMN family. The protein plays a role in pre-mRNA processing, possibly tissue-specific alternative splicing events. Although individual snRNPs are believed to recognize specific nucleic acid sequences through RNA-RNA base pairing, the specific role of this family member is unknown. The protein arises from a bicistronic transcript that also encodes a protein identified as the SNRPN upstream reading frame (SNURF). Multiple transcription initiation sites have been identified and extensive alternative splicing occurs in the 5' untranslated region. Additional splice variants have been described but sequences for the complete transcripts have not been determined. The 5' UTR of this gene has been identified as an imprinting center. Alternative splicing or deletion caused by a translocation event in this paternally-expressed region is responsible for Prader-Willi syndrome due to parental imprint switch failure.

SNRPN-methylation is used to detect uniparental disomy of chromosome 15.  After fluorescent-in-situ-hybridization has confirmed the presence of either SNRPN or UBE3A (a neighboring gene that is also imprinted), the methylation test (of SNRPN) can reveal whether the patient has uniparental disomy.  SNRPN is maternally methylated (silenced). UBE3A appears to be paternally methylated (silenced).

References

Further reading